Neuhaus am Rennweg is a town in the district of Sonneberg, in Thuringia, Germany. It is situated in the Thuringian Forest, 17 km north of Sonneberg, and 22 km southwest of Saalfeld. The former municipalities Lichte and Piesau were merged into Neuhaus am Rennweg in January 2019.

References

Sonneberg (district)
Schwarzburg-Rudolstadt